Cotter School District 60  is a school district in Baxter County, Arkansas, headquartered in Cotter. It serves Cotter and Gassville.

Its schools are Cotter Elementary School and Cotter High School.

References

External links
 
 
 
School districts in Arkansas
Education in Baxter County, Arkansas